Puerto, a Spanish word meaning seaport, may refer to:

Places
El Puerto de Santa María, Andalusia, Spain
Puerto, a seaport town in Cagayan de Oro, Philippines
Puerto Colombia, Colombia
Puerto Cumarebo, Venezuela
Puerto Galera, Oriental Mindoro, Philippines
Puerto La Cruz, Venezuela
Puerto Píritu, Venezuela
Puerto Princesa, Palawan, Philippines
Puerto Rico, an unincorporated territory of the United States
Puerto Vallarta, Mexico

Others
Puerto Rico (board game)
Operación Puerto doping case

See also
 
 Puerta (disambiguation)